Flight 107 may refer to:
 LAN Chile Flight 107, crashed on 6 February 1965
 FlyMontserrat Flight 107, crashed on 7 October 2012

0107